Pure Pumpkin Flower is South Korean television series starring Lee Chung-ah, Bae Jong-ok, Jin Tae-hyun and Jang Hyun-sung. It aired on SBS on Mondays to Fridays at 19:20 from November 15, 2010 to May 13, 2011 for 124 episodes.

Cast
Lee Chung-ah as Park Soon-jung
Kim Yoo-jung as young Soon-jung
Bae Jong-ok as Joon-sun
Jin Tae-hyun as Yoo Min-soo
Jang Hyun-sung as Hyun-mook
Park Si-eun as Oh Sa-ra
Im Hyun-sik as old man Oh
Shin Eun-jung as Oh Kyung-bok
Ban Hyo-jung as Ms. Jang
Kim Il-woo as Oh Geum-bok
Lee Hye-sook as Pil-soon
Yoo Yeon-seok as Hyo-joon
Im Se-mi as Hyo-sun
Kim Hyung-bum as Sung-woon
Cha Kwang-soo as Oh Eun-bok
Lee Eung-kyung as Se-mi
Kim Dong-beom as Hyo-jae
Park Young-ji as Yoo Jae-hwan
Choi Joon-yong as Kwang-woon
Jin Ye-sol as Joon-sun's personal secretary
Kim Ye-ryeong as Kim Myung-ja
Kim Sun-il as businessman
Ha Na-kyung as restaurant employee

References

External links
Pure Pumpkin Flower official SBS website 

Seoul Broadcasting System television dramas
2010 South Korean television series debuts
2011 South Korean television series endings
Korean-language television shows
Television series by Pan Entertainment
South Korean romance television series
South Korean melodrama television series